Paul David Gustav du Bois-Reymond (2 December 1831 – 7 April 1889) was a German mathematician who was born in Berlin and died in Freiburg. He was the brother of Emil du Bois-Reymond.

His thesis was concerned with the mechanical equilibrium of fluids. He worked on the theory of functions and in mathematical physics. His interests included Sturm–Liouville theory, integral equations, variational calculus, and Fourier series. In this latter field, he was able in 1873 to construct a continuous function whose Fourier series is not convergent. His lemma defines a sufficient condition to guarantee that a function vanishes almost everywhere.

Du Bois-Reymond also established that a trigonometric series that converges to a continuous function at every point is the Fourier series of this function.  He is also associated with the fundamental lemma of calculus of variations of which he proved a refined version based on that of Lagrange.

Theory of infinitesimals
Paul du Bois-Reymond developed a theory of infinitesimals:

Writings
 Théorie générale des fonctions (Nice : Impr. niçoise, 1887) (translated in French from the original German by G. Millaud and A. Girot) 
 De Aequilibrio Fluidorum (PhD Thesis, 1859)

References

External links 
 
 
 

1831 births
1889 deaths
19th-century German mathematicians
Scientists from Berlin
People from the Province of Brandenburg
Academic staff of the University of Freiburg
Academic staff of the University of Tübingen
Academic staff of the Technical University of Berlin
German people of French descent